The 2013 Women's European Union Amateur Boxing Championships were held in Keszthely, Hungary from July 1 to July 7. This was the 7th edition of this competition organised by the European governing body for amateur boxing, the European Boxing Confederation (EUBC).

Medal winners

Medal count table

References

2013 Women's European Union Amateur Boxing Championships
Women's European Union Amateur Boxing Championships
International boxing competitions hosted by Hungary
European
July 2013 sports events in Europe